The Volkswagen ID.3 is a battery electric small family car (C-segment) produced by Volkswagen since 2019. It is the first production car to utilize the MEB platform, and the first model of the ID. series. It was unveiled on 9 September 2019 at the Frankfurt Motor Show, after being first shown as the I.D. concept car at the 2016 Paris Motor Show. Deliveries to retail customers began in Germany in September 2020.

Overview

I.D. Concept 
The ID.3 was previewed as a concept car called the Volkswagen I.D., first shown at the 2016 Paris Motor Show. It was the first concept model of the new all-electric I.D. sub-brand. According to Volkswagen, the I.D. featured innovations such as virtual wing mirrors (using video cameras), "chocolate bar" battery design, and retractable LiDAR sensors used for autonomous driving, not all of which made it to the production version.

Production model
In May 2019, Volkswagen confirmed the production model based on this prototype was named Volkswagen ID.3, instead of the rumoured I.D. Neo name, and officially presented at the International Motor Show Germany in September 2019. The ID.3 is one of five new Volkswagen models based on the MEB platform. Smaller cars bearing the ID.1 and ID.2 names are expected, and bigger models will range from ID.4 to ID.9. Volkswagen has also applied for trademark protection of an additional "X", supposedly for a SUV. Reservations (€1000) for the launch model of the ID.3 started on the 8 May 2019, which were set to be delivered in midyear 2020, whereas the base model, expected to cost under €30,000, will be delivered in 2021. Volkswagen named high expected demand as a reason. It received 10,000 buyer reservations within 24 hours after pre-orders opened and 30,000 before the unveiling at IAA 2019. Retail deliveries began in Germany in September 2020.

The production version of the ID.3 was unveiled on 9 September 2019 at the Frankfurt Motor Show (IAA), along with the new Volkswagen logo and branding. The cars are assembled at Volkswagen's Zwickau factory, where the company expects the full plant capacity (330,000 cars per year) to produce electric cars based on the MEB platform for the Volkswagen Group from 2021 onwards. In 2021, an additional ID.3 production line was started at the Transparent Factory in Dresden.

In 2021, Volkswagen stated they were considering a convertible version, releasing 2 design illustrations.

Facelift
On February 18, 2023, Volkswagen published a video teaser of the ID.3 facelift, with the official debut taking place on March 1.

Specifications
At launch, the European-market ID.3 was available with a choice of two models: "ID.3 Pro Performance" and "ID.3 Pro S". The difference was in the storage capacity of the battery; the Pro Performance battery had a useful capacity of 58 kWh, while the Pro S battery was 77 kWh. An entry-level model was released as the "ID.3 Pure Performance" in April 2021. A high-performance variant of the ID.3 is under consideration, using battery technology derived from the ID.R project.

Three different battery choices are offered with the ID.3.

Charging rate for the Pro Performance and Pro S is limited to a maximum of 11 kW using the on-board AC charger; when a DC source is connected through the standard CCS inlet, maximum input power rises to 100 kW (Pro Performance) or 125 kW (Pro S). The charging rates for the basic model were planned to be limited to 7.2 kW (AC) and 50 kW (DC), with an option for 100 kW (DC). The MEB platform supports up to 125 kW charging. The 58 kWh version supports 120 kW DC charging.

The 77 kWh variants have four and five seat options; the others seat five. All but the 77 kWh variant will have an optional panoramic roof that can be combined with a bike rack on a support hook at the back.

Trims

It was first available in three different launch trim levels, namely ID.3 1st, ID.3 1st Plus and ID.3 1st Max, all based on the Pro Performance model (58 kWh battery). The battery size and powertrain remain the same across all three trim levels; however, there are different levels of equipment, styling options and wheels.

Software issues
In early 2020 it was announced that delivery of the ID.3 was going to be delayed until at least September 2020 due to software errors that VW had yet to be able to resolve. Some stripped-down cars were delivered in September with cloud-connected ones being delivered at the end of 2020.

Awards 

 In January 2021, the ID.3 Pro Performance Life was named Small Electric Car of the Year by What Car? magazine. What Car? awarded the ID.3 five stars out of five in its review of the car.

Sales 
Almost 57,000 units were delivered in 2020, ranking among the world's top-ten best-selling plug-in cars in just four months on the market.

See also
 e-Golf
 Electric car use by country

References

ID.3
Cars introduced in 2019
2020s cars
Production electric cars
Rear-wheel-drive vehicles
Hatchbacks